Arene is a genus of small sea snails that have a calcareous operculum, marine gastropod molluscs in the family Areneidae.

The genus Arene (and also the genus Cinysca) are placed within the family Areneidae, although Areneidae was not officially described as a taxon name. Areneidae is provisionally placed within the superfamily Angarioidea, according to Williams et al. (2008)

Species
Species within the genus Arene include:
 Arene adusta McLean, 1970
 Arene alta Rubio & Rolán, 2018
 Arene bairdii (W. H. Dall, 1889)
 Arene balboai (Strong & Hertlein, 1939)
 Arene bitleri Olsson & McGinty, 1958
 Arene boucheti Leal, 1991
 Arene brasiliana (W. H. Dall, 1927)
 Arene briareus (W. H. Dall, 1881)
 Arene carinata Carpenter, 1857
 Arene centrifuga (W. H. Dall, 1896)
 Arene cruentata (Mühlfeld, 1824)
 Arene curacoana Pilsbry, 1934
 Arene descensa Rubio & Rolán, 2018
 Arene echinacantha (Melvill & Standen, 1903) 
 Arene echinata McLean, 1970
 Arene ferruginosa J. H. McLean, 1970
 Arene flexispina Leal & Coelho, 1985
 Arene fricki Crosse, 1865
 Arene guttata McLean, 1970
 Arene guyanensis Rubio & Rolán, 2018
 Arene hindsiana Pilsbry & Lowe, 1932
 Arene laguairana Weisbord, 1962
 Arene lucasensis Strong, 1933
 Arene lurida (W. H. Dall, 1913)
 Arene lychee Cavallari & Simone, 2018
 Arene microforis (W. H. Dall, 1889)
 Arene miniata (W. H. Dall, 1889)
 Arene notialis Marini, 1975
 Arene olivacea (W. H. Dall, 1918)
 Arene pulex Faber, 2009
 Arene riisei Rehder, 1943
 Arene socorroensis (Strong, 1934)
 Arene stellata J. H. McLean, 1970
 † Arene stephensoni Schremp, 1981  (synonym: Liotia (Arene) machapoorieensis Mansfield, 1925) 
 Arene tamsiana (Philippi, 1852)
 Arene tricarinata (Stearns, 1872)
 Arene variabilis (W. H. Dall, 1889)
 Arene venusta (Woodring, 1928)
 Arene venustula Aguayo & Rehder, 1936

Other species include:
 Arene californica (W. H. Dall, 1908): synonym of Macrarene californica (W. H. Dall, 1908)
 Arene coronadensis (Stohler, 1959) = Macrarene coronadensis
 Arene diegensis J. H. McLean, 1964
 Arene farallonensis (A. G. Smith, 1952)
 Arene lepidotera (J. H. Mclean, 1970)
 Arene pacis (Dall, 1908)

References

Further reading
 

Areneidae
Gastropod genera